Balibago is a barangay of Angeles City, Philippines. It is located around 50 miles north of the nation's capital, Manila. Within its border to the former U.S. Clark Air Base. Balibago has been described as "the entertainment district of Angeles City", as well as being a red-light district.

Balibago has a vibrant night life, with a number of fine restaurants, shopping malls and a casino along the stretch of McArthur Highway. Fields Avenue, also known as Walking Street, has the "main bar strip" in Balibao. From the crossing of McArthur Highway, Fields Avenue extends into the Clark Perimeter Road (Friendship Road), where gogo bars and hostess bars are located. Despite the practice being illegal in the Philippines, prostitution is also known to exist on the Fields Avenue strip.

References

External links
 

Angeles City